The 1909 New York Giants season was the franchise's 27th season. The team finished in third place in the National League with a 92–61 record, 18½ games behind the Pittsburgh Pirates.

Regular season

Season standings

Record vs. opponents

Roster

Player stats

Batting

Starters by position 
Note: Pos = Position; G = Games played; AB = At bats; H = Hits; Avg. = Batting average; HR = Home runs; RBI = Runs batted in

Other batters 
Note: G = Games played; AB = At bats; H = Hits; Avg. = Batting average; HR = Home runs; RBI = Runs batted in

Pitching

Starting pitchers 
Note: G = Games pitched; IP = Innings pitched; W = Wins; L = Losses; ERA = Earned run average; SO = Strikeouts

Other pitchers 
Note: G = Games pitched; IP = Innings pitched; W = Wins; L = Losses; ERA = Earned run average; SO = Strikeouts

Relief pitchers 
Note: G = Games pitched; W = Wins; L = Losses; SV = Saves; ERA = Earned run average; SO = Strikeouts

Awards and honors

League top five finishers 
Red Ames
 #5 strikeouts (156)

Al Bridwell
 #3 on-base percentage (.386)
 #5 batting average (.294)

Larry Doyle
 #3 slugging percentage (.419)
 #4 batting average (.302)

Christy Mathewson
 #1 earned run average (1.14)
 #2 wins (25)

Moose McCormick
 #5 slugging percentage (.402)

Red Murray
 #1 home runs (7)
 #2 runs batted in (91)
 #2 stolen bases (48)

External links
1909 New York Giants season at Baseball Reference

New York Giants (NL)
San Francisco Giants seasons
New York Giants season
New York G
1900s in Manhattan
Washington Heights, Manhattan